John Martin Goodyear (June 10, 1920 – March 7, 2002) was an American football running back in the National Football League (NFL) for the Washington Redskins.  He played college football at Marquette University and was drafted in the tenth round of the 1942 NFL Draft.

External links
 
 

1920 births
2002 deaths
American football running backs
Marquette Golden Avalanche football players
Washington Redskins players
Players of American football from Chicago